Bhokharaha Narshingh gaupalika   is aRural municipality  in Sunsari District in the Kosi Zone of south-eastern Nepal. At the time of the 2017 Nepal census it had a population of 31,468 people living in 3799 individual households.

References

1. The Ministry of Federal Affairs and Local Development (Nepal)

Populated places in Sunsari District